The Real McKenzies is a Canadian Celtic punk band founded in 1992 and based in Vancouver, British Columbia. They are one of the founders of the Celtic punk movement, albeit 10 years after The Pogues.

In addition to writing and performing original music, Real McKenzies perform traditional Scottish songs, giving them a new punk-influenced sound. They have shared stages with many other bands including Rancid, Shane MacGowan,  NOFX, Flogging Molly, The Misfits, Metallica, and Voodoo Glow Skulls.

History
Founding member Paul McKenzie has been the only consistent member of the band since its inception. The band released its first album, Clash of the Tartans, in 1998. McKenzie claims as many as 100 different musicians have performed as members of the band, including piper Alan "Raven" MacLeod, of the pioneering Scottish folk band The Tannahill Weavers and "Bourne and MacLeod".

McKenzie said in 2014 that he "fired all the Americans" in the band and returned to full Canadian lineup. Despite that claim, Aspy Luison is from Cambre, Galicia, Spain.

In September 2014 the band announced they would be recording their next album for Fat Wreck Chords at Motor Studio in San Francisco. Michael "Fat Mike" Burkett will be producing the album.

On April 7, 2015, Fat Wreck Chords released The Real McKenzies' 11th album, Rats in the Burlap.

Their previous album, Westwinds, was released on March 27, 2012, with Fat Wreck Chords.

A biography of the band, written by Chris Walter and titled Under the Kilt: The Real McKenzies Exposed, was released in early 2015.

On March 10, 2022, it was announced on the band's Instagram and TikTok that former War Baby drummer Kirby J. Fisher would become the band's new drummer.

Music in commercials
In the 1990s, the Real McKenzies music was used by InBev to promote Kokanee beer.

In 2021 The Real McKenzie's song “Chip” was used by Ford in Australia to advertise their new Ford Ranger pickup truck.

Music in popular culture
Their song "Tae the Battle" appeared in the 2008 British-Canadian film Stone of Destiny.
Their song "Wild Cattieyote" appeared in the 2004 straight-to-video release of Vampires vs. Zombies (also called Carmilla the Lesbian Vampire).
Their cover of the Turbonegro song "Sailor Man" appeared in the 2003 video game Tony Hawk's Underground and the first volume of the Elementality skateboarding videos. Each year, The Real McKenzies version of "Auld Lang Syne" is used as the countdown music on the New Year's Eve edition of Kevin Smith and Ralph Garman's live podcast Hollywood Babble-On.
Their song "Chip" was used in the TV series Billions in 2018.

Band members

Current members
Paul McKenzie – vocals (1992–present)
Aspy Luison – bagpipes (2012–present)
Kenny Lush – guitar (2022–present)
Barry Higginson - Bass (2021-present)
Paul Patko (Paco) - Drums (2022-present)
Mario Nieva – guitar (2013–2015 & 2019-present)

Former members

Kirby J. Fisher - drums (2022)
Dan Garrison - guitar (2015-2018)
Dan Stenning - drums (2016-2018)
Andrew Pederson - guitar (2017-2018)
Tony Walker (Tony Baloney) – guitar, occasional bass (1992–1999)
Rob Esch – drums (1992–1995)
Aaron Chapman – bass (1992), tin whistle (1992–1994, 1994–1997)
Rich Priske (Angus MacFuzzybutt) – bass (1992–1995, 1996–1998) (deceased) 
Nathan Roberts – bagpipes (1993)
Alan "Raven" MacLeod – bagpipes, guitar (1993–1995, 1996–1998, 2008)
Kurt Robertson (Dirty Kurt) – guitar, occasional bass (1993–2005, 2007–2013)
Anthony Creery (Farkie) – bass (1995–1996)
James Brander (JT Massacre) – drums (1995–1996)
Jamie Fawkes – bass (1996, 1998–2004)
Brien O'Brien – drums (1996–1998)
Mike MacDonald – bagpipes (occasionally from 1997–1998)
Glenn Kruger – drums (1998–2000)
Bradford Lambert – drums (2000–2003, 2004–2005)
Stuart MacNeil – bagpipes (1998–1999)

Anthony Kerr – bagpipes (1999–2000)
Mark "Bone" Boland – guitar (1999–2015)
Matt Hawley (Matt MacNasty) – bagpipes (2000–2012, occasionally from 2012–2017)
Eddie Big Beers – drums (2003)
Ike Eidness – drums (2003–2004)
Ken Fleming – bass (2004–2005)
Sean Sellers – drums (2005–2012)
Joe Raposo – bass (2005–2009)
Dave Gregg – guitar (2005–2010)
Karl Alvarez – bass (2007, 2009–2010)
Justin "Gwomper" Burdick – bass (2010–2011, 2012)
Brent Johnson – bass (2011), guitar (2011–2013)
Gord Taylor – bagpipes (2010–2012, occasionally from 2012–2017)
Jesse Pinner – drums (2012–2016)

Former guest members
Glenn Murray – bass (1993)
Jay Bentley – bass (1997)
Dave Afflick – drums (2005)
George McWhinnie – bass (2005)
Boz Rivera – drums (2007, 2009, 2010)
Randy Steffes – guitar, banjo (2009, 2012)
Maggie Schmied – violin (2009)
Robbie "Steed" Davidson – guitar (2010)

Timeline

Discography
 Real McKenzies, 1995
 Clash of the Tartans, 1998
 Fat Club 7", 2000
 Loch'd and Loaded, 2001
 Pissed tae th' Gills, 2002
 Oot & Aboot, 2003
 10,000 Shots, 2005
 Off the Leash, 2008
 Shine Not Burn, 2010
 Westwinds, 2012
 Rats in the Burlap, 2015
 Two Devils Will Talk, 2017
 Beer and Loathing, 2020
Songs of the Highlands, Songs of the Sea, 2022

Filmography
 Pissed tae th' Gills, 2002

Compilations
 Short Music for Short People, 1999
 Alpha Motherfuckers - A Tribute to Turbonegro, 2001
 Agropop Now, 2003
 Floyd:..And Out Come the Teeth, a free Fat Wreck Chords compilation CD handed out at the label's tent during Warped Tour 2001
 Shot Spots - Trooper Tribute (Visionary Records)
 Live from Europe, Deconstruction Tour, 2003 - DVD

Music videos
 "Mainland" (1998)
 "Drink Some More" (2008)
 "Chip" (Live) (2008)
 "The Maple Trees Remember" (2009)
 "Culling the Herd" (2011)
 "My Luck Is So Bad" (2012)
 "Catch Me" (2015)
 "Stephen's Green" (2015)
 "Yes" (2015)
 "Due West" (2017)
 "Seafarers" (2017)
 "One Day" (2018)

Images

See also
List of bands from Canada

References

External links

 

Canadian punk rock groups
Musical groups established in 1992
Celtic punk groups
Fat Wreck Chords artists
Canadian Celtic music groups
Musical groups from Vancouver
1992 establishments in British Columbia